Litomosoides scotti is a parasitic nematode in the genus Litomosoides. First described in 1973, it infects the marsh rice rat (Oryzomys palustris) and is known from a saltwater marsh at Cedar Key, Florida.

See also 
 List of parasites of the marsh rice rat

References

Literature cited 
Forrester, D.J. and Kinsella, J.M. 1973. Comparative morphology and ecology of two species of Litomosoides (Nematoda: Filarioidea) of rodents in Florida, with a key to the species of Litomosoides Chandler, 1931 (subscription required). International Journal for Parasitology 3(2):255–263.
Kinsella, J.M. 1988. Comparison of helminths of rice rats, Oryzomys palustris, from freshwater and saltwater marshes in Florida. Proceedings of the Helminthological Society of Washington 55(2):275–280.

Spirurida
Nematodes described in 1973
Parasites of rodents